A. Derek Guthrie was a Justice with the Quebec Superior Court. 

He is a graduate of the McGill University Faculty of Law (BCL 1960), where he served as Editor-in-chief of the McGill Law Journal.

References

Judges in Quebec
Living people
Year of birth missing (living people)
McGill University Faculty of Law alumni
McGill Law Journal editors